Tyrconnell is a historic home located in Baltimore County, Maryland, United States. The house was designed by the Baltimore firm of Mottu and White in 1919, in Colonial Revival style. Also on the property is a frame gardeners’ house, a grouping of four barns and a shed, a garage, and two stone spring houses.

Tyrconnell was listed on the National Register of Historic Places in 1973  and is protected by conservation easements held by Maryland Environmental Trust.

References

External links
, including undated photo, at Maryland Historical Trust

Houses on the National Register of Historic Places in Maryland
Houses in Baltimore County, Maryland
Houses completed in 1919
Colonial Revival architecture in Maryland
Towson, Maryland
National Register of Historic Places in Baltimore County, Maryland